The Indian Railways are broadly organised from functional groups within the Indian Railway Service. India's rail system is managed at a regional level since Indian Railways have divided themselves into eighteen zonal railways. Each zone, headed by a General Manager, is semi-autonomous and this creates a matrix organisation where the functional branches are under dual control viz.
 Operational Control at Zonal level
 Functional Policy & Guidance from the Railway Board

Railway Board

At the apex of the management organisation is the Railway Board, a part of the Ministry of Railways. The board is headed by a  Chairman who directly reports to the Railway Minister. The board has five other members.

The General Managers of the zonal railways and the production units report to the Board.

Zonal management

The current 18 zones of the Indian Railways are

Divisional organisation

The Divisional Railway Manager (DRM) heads the organisation at the division level. There are currently 71 divisions on the system nationwide. The divisions are primarily involved with train running but may also have locomotive sheds (repair shops for locomotives), coaching depots (repair home bases for passenger trains), and wagon depots (repair and maintenance points for freight stock).

Each division has all the functional organisations (both line and staff). The heads of these functional groups report to the DRM for administrative purposes but rely on the railway board and the zonal headquarters for policy guidelines.

Cadres
The various Group A cadres are as below:

Central Civil Services recruitment through Civil Services Examination (CSE) conducted by UPSC:
 IRTS -  Indian Railway Traffic Service
 IRPS - Indian Railway Personnel Service
 IRAS - Indian Railway Accounts Service
 IRPFS - Indian Railway Protection Force Service

Central Engineering Services   recruitment through Engineering Services Examination (ESE) conducted by UPSC:
 IRSE - Indian Railway Service (Civil) Engineers
 IRSEE - Indian Railway Service of Electrical Engineers
 IRSME - Indian Railway Service of Mechanical Engineers
 IRSSE - Indian Railway Service of Signal Engineers
 IRSS - Indian Railway Stores Service

Central Health Science Services recruitment through Combined Medical Services Examination (CMSE) conducted by UPSC:
 IRMS - Indian Railway Medical Service

See also
 Zones and divisions of Indian Railways
 Centralised Training Institutes of the Indian Railways

References

External links
 Official websites
 Central Railway 
 Eastern Railway 
 East Central Railway 
 East Coast Railway 
 Northern Railway 
 North Central Railway 
 North Western Railway 
 North Eastern Railway 
 Northeast Frontier Railway 
 Southern Railway 
 South Central Railway 
 South Eastern Railway
 South East Central Railway 
 South Western Railway 
 Western Railway 
 West Central Railway 
 Metro Railway, Kolkata 

organisational structure